Abner van Reenen (born ) is a South African rugby union player for the Rovigo Delta in the Top10. His regular position is fly-half.

In 2020 Van Reenen was named in the  squad for the Super Rugby Unlocked campaign.

References

South African rugby union players
Living people
1998 births
People from Paarl
Rugby union fly-halves
Stormers players
Western Province (rugby union) players
Rugby Rovigo Delta players
Rugby union players from the Western Cape